Governor of the Central Bank of Iran is the highest administrative authority of the Central Bank of Iran, making decisions concerning all such current affairs of the bank.

Presently, the President appoints the governor upon the recommendation of the Minister of Economic Affairs and Finance, who must be verified by the CBI's general assembly.

Unlike many countries, the governor of central bank is not mandated to decide on the monetary policy in Iran by himself, but he is head of the body with that responsibility, The Currency and Credit Council, an organ within the central bank but controlled by the government. The governor is assisted by an executive board comprising, in addition to himself as the chairman, the deputy governor, vice-governors, and the secretary-general of the Currency and Credit Council. 

The law specifies no fixed term for the governor, however the officeholder is appointed for five years.

List 
The governors of Central Bank of Iran are as follows:

References 

 
Lists of office-holders in Iran
Lists of central bankers